Moravany nad Váhom is a village and municipality in Piešťany District in the Trnava Region of western Slovakia.

History 

In historical records the village was first mentioned in 1348.

A small female figurine called the Venus of Moravany was found near the village.

Geography 
The municipality lies at an elevation of 200 metres and covers an area of 10.786 km². It has a population of about 2041.

References

External links 

 
 Official website of the parish Moravany nad Váhom - only in Slovak

Villages and municipalities in Piešťany District
Archaeological sites in Slovakia